Charles Towne (1763–1840) was an English painter of landscapes, horses and other animals, horse-racing and hunting scenes.

Life

Towne was born in Wigan, the son of Richard Town, a portrait-painter from Liverpool, and his wife Mary. His talent for art was apparent from a young age and he received some training from landscape painter John Rathbone in Leeds. He then worked as a coach and ornamental painter with his brother in Liverpool, and also worked for a time in Lancaster and Manchester. In 1785 he married Margaret Harrison, a widow.

In 1787 Towne exhibited a small landscape in an exhibition in Liverpool. By the 1790s he was an established animal painter with a style reminiscent of Stubbs. He lived in London from 1799 to 1804 during which time he exhibited at the Royal Academy. He also added a final 'e' to his name. He became a friend of fellow artists George Morland and De Loutherbourg.

Between 1799 and 1823 he exhibited twelve works at the Royal Academy and four at the British Institution. He returned to Liverpool in 1810, and was a founder member of the Liverpool Academy, becoming vice-president in 1812–13, and exhibiting his work there for several years on and off. He resided in Liverpool until 1837, when he apparently returned to London, Towne died at Norton Street Islington Liverpool 1840.

Work
Towne painted landscapes and animals, and obtained great celebrity in Lancashire and Cheshire by his portraits of horses, dogs, and cattle. Many of his pictures were small, but occasionally he ventured into landscapes with cattle of larger size. He also painted in watercolour, and was a candidate for admission to the Watercolour Society in 1809. His work was reasonably well regarded by his contemporary Joseph Farrington, though he also noted that Towne was a man of "coarse, debased manners and conversation". According to artist W. S. Sparrow, "his landscapes are minutely detailed and have a Dutch mannerism; animals and figures are put in with diligent and affectionate care". However the Dictionary of National Biography commented that his work "though carefully drawn" was "wanting in spirit and originality".

He painted "Old Billy", the longest-living horse on record, who pulled barges on the canals.

Notes

References
Charles Towne - biography (Richard Green Fine Paintings).
Charles Towne - biography (John Mitchell Fine Paintings).

Attribution

Further reading
Bennett, Mary. Merseyside Painters, People and Places (Walker Art Gallery, 1979).

External links

Paintings by Charles Towne (Bridgeman Art Library)
Paintings by Towne ("Encore editions", Fine Art prints)
A Tiger (Oil on panel, 1818 - Wolverhampton Art Gallery)
Waiting for dinner (Oil on canvas - Christie's)
Backbarrow cotton mill (Oil on canvas, 1810 - The Art Fund)
A peasant and his dog (oil on canvas, 1800 - Christie's)

18th-century English painters
English male painters
19th-century English painters
English watercolourists
Landscape artists
People from Wigan
Equine artists
Dog artists
1763 births
1840 deaths
19th-century English male artists
18th-century English male artists